The Coast of Utopia is a 2002 trilogy of plays: Voyage, Shipwreck, and Salvage, written by Tom Stoppard with focus on the philosophical debates in pre-revolution Russia between 1833 and 1866. It was the recipient of the 2007 Tony Award for Best Play. The title comes from a chapter in Avrahm Yarmolinsky's book Road to Revolution: A Century of Russian Radicalism (1959).

The trilogy, nine hours in total, premiered with Voyage on 22 June 2002 at the National Theatre's Olivier auditorium in repertory, directed by Trevor Nunn. The openings of Shipwreck and Salvage followed on 8 July, and 19 July, completing its run on 23 November 2002. In 2006, directed by Jack O'Brien, the plays debuted on Broadway at the Vivian Beaumont Theater at Lincoln Center, New York City, where it closed on 13 May 2007 after a combined total of 124 performances.

The trilogy has also been performed in Russia; it opened at Moscow's Russian Academic Youth Theatre in October 2007, directed by Alexey Borodin.

The trilogy received its Japanese premiere at Theater Cocoon, Bunkamura in Tokyo on 12 September 2009 and completed its run (including 10 one-day marathon performances) on 4 October 2009. The production was directed by Yukio Ninagawa.

Production history

London premiere
Directed by Trevor Nunn, the trilogy premiered with Voyage at the Olivier Theatre in London on 22 June 2002, followed by Shipwreck and Salvage with a six-month run ended on 23 November 2002.

Reviewing the play in The Guardian, drama critic Michael Billington wrote, "Tom Stoppard's The Coast of Utopia in the Olivier is a bundle of contradictions. Comprising three three-hour plays, it is heroically ambitious and wildly uneven. ... But I wouldn't have missed it for worlds and at its heart it contains a fascinating lesson about the nature of drama." He further commented on Stoppard the dramatist, "I think it is time we began to appreciate Stoppard not for his intellectual legerdemain, but for what he is actually best at: exploring the mystery of existence, the anguish of the human heart and the strange fact that it is our apprehension of death that gives joy and intensity to life."

Broadway debut
The trilogy's Broadway debut was directed by Jack O'Brien at the Vivian Beaumont Theater in New York City. The cast included Brían F. O'Byrne, Richard Easton, Jennifer Ehle, Billy Crudup, Ethan Hawke, Josh Hamilton, Martha Plimpton, David Harbour, Jason Butler Harner and Amy Irving.
Viewed as "the season's ultimate snob ticket", the production ran from November 2006 to May 2007 with a combined total of 124 performances.

In his review for The New York Times, Ben Brantley called the production "brave and gorgeous", adding that "I wouldn't call it [the play] a major work of art. In literary terms I wouldn't even rank it with Mr. Stoppard's best (in which I include the Broadway-bound Rock 'n' Roll). But as directed by Jack O'Brien and acted and designed by a stellar team of artisans, Utopia is a major work of theatrical craftsmanship, a luscious advertisement for the singular narrative seductiveness of drama."

The production was nominated for ten Tony Awards and won seven, breaking the Tony record for the most awards given to a play.

Characters and cast
The following table indicates the roles played by the main cast in London, New York, and Moscow, respectively. Several principal actors played multiple roles in each of the three plays.

Historical figures
The play is well known for including a cast of more than 70 characters, many based on historical figures of the period.
Major Characters 
 Mikhail Bakunin
 Vissarion Belinsky
 Alexander Herzen
 Nikolay Ogarev
 Ivan Turgenev

Minor Characters 
 Konstantin Aksakov
 Louis Blanc
 Pyotr Chaadayev
 Nikolay Chernyshevsky
 Timofey Granovsky
 Georg Herwegh
 Ernest Charles Jones
 Gottfried Kinkel
 Lajos Kossuth
 Alexandre Auguste Ledru-Rollin
 Karl Marx
 Giuseppe Mazzini
 Nikolai Polevoy
 Alexander Pushkin
 Arnold Ruge
 Stepan Shevyryov
 Nikolai Stankevich
 Malwida von Meysenbug
 Stanisław Gabriel Worcell

Awards and nominations  
Awards
 2007 Drama Desk Award Outstanding Play
 2007 New York Drama Critics' Circle Best Play
 2007 Tony Award for Best Play
 2007 Drama Desk Award Outstanding Music for a Play (Mark Bennett)

References

Further reading

External links
 
 
 
 
 The New York Times Reading list for The Coast of Utopia
 The New York Times Review: Part 1 - Voyage
 The New York Times Review: Part 2 - Shipwreck
 The New York Times Review: Part 3 - Salvage
 Official website of Voyage, Shipwreck, and Salvage at the Lincoln Center Theater
 Overview of London's production
 'Radical Comedy', review of The Coast of Utopia in the Oxonian Review

2002 plays
Broadway plays
West End plays
Drama Desk Award-winning plays
New York Drama Critics' Circle Award winners
Plays by Tom Stoppard
Tony Award-winning plays
Mikhail Bakunin